Anthurium watermaliense, the black anthurium or black prince, is a species of flowering plant in the family Araceae, native to Costa Rica, Panama, and Colombia. Its dark purple spathes make it popular as a houseplant.

References

watermaliense
House plants
Flora of Costa Rica
Flora of Panama
Flora of Colombia
Plants described in 1914